Alytopistis is a genus of moths belonging to the subfamily Tortricinae of the family Tortricidae.

Species
Alytopistis tortricitella (Walker, 1866)

See also
List of Tortricidae genera

References

External links
tortricidae.com

Tortricidae genera
Monotypic moth genera
Taxa named by Edward Meyrick
Tortricinae